Čečehov is a village and municipality in Michalovce District in the Kosice Region of eastern Slovakia.

History
In historical records the village was first mentioned in 1410.

Geography
The village lies at an altitude of 106 metres and covers an area of  (2020-06-30/-07-01).

Ethnicity
The population is 96% Slovak in ethnicity.

Population 
It has a population of 395 people (2020-12-31).

Economy
The village has a food store.

Transport
The nearest railway station is located 10 kilometres away at Michalovce.

Genealogical resources

The records for genealogical research are available at the state archive "Statny Archiv in Presov, Slovakia"

 Roman Catholic church records (births/marriages/deaths): 1824-1912 (parish B)
 Greek Catholic church records (births/marriages/deaths): 1806-1913 (parish B)
 Reformated church records (births/marriages/deaths): 1747-1940 (parish B)

See also
 List of municipalities and towns in Slovakia

References

External links
http://www.statistics.sk/mosmis/eng/run.html
Surnames of living people in Cecehov

Villages and municipalities in Michalovce District